An ōdzutsu (Japanese: 大筒, lit. "big cylinder") was a type of artillery used during the Sengoku Jidai and the early Edo period in Japan.

Description 
The ōdzutsu was used primarily in naval and siege battles during the Sengoku Jidai for its efficiency in destroying large enemy structures.

Though interpretations of ōdzutsu differ in literature, it is generally regarded as a weapon of forged iron to distinguish it from an ishibiya (a cast bronze hand cannon). Its bullets were about 20 maces (75 grams). It is fixed to a ring or a wooden frame with only the barrel and fired using a difference fire. Some have an ignition system and a stock that uses a matchlock.

It was considerably more powerful than its cast bronze counterpart, and because it was forged, the risk of the barrel exploding was smaller than that of a cast gun. It could be relatively easily manufactured due to its inexpensive materials, but cannot be produced with too large a diameter due to limited forging techniques at the time.

There is a famous large ōdzutsu, known as the Shibatsuji Gun, located in the Yūshūkan of Yasukuni Shrine, Tokyo.

Other remarks 

 The range of a 50-mace (187-gram) ōdzutsu manufactured by the Kunitomo gunsmiths can reach up to 1.6 kilometers.
 The Izu suigun of the Sengoku Jidai used ōdzutsu extensively in naval battles.

References 

Samurai weapons and equipment
Early firearms
Firearms of Japan
Japanese inventions
Weapons of Japan